The 39th Guards Motor Rifle Division of the Soviet Ground Forces was a mechanised infantry division active from 1965 to 1992. It was originally formed as the 39th Guards Rifle Division of the Workers and Peasant's Red Army. It was formed during the German-Soviet War as part of the 62nd Army and assigned to the defense of Stalingrad, officially arriving in the theater in August 1942.  In September the division fought through German forces which were attempting to encircle the city, and was assigned to defend the 'Volga Corridor,' the last supply line remaining for Soviet units in the city.

Defense of the Red October Steel Works 

From September 30, 1942, the division, which could muster only roughly half its original strength, was assigned to defend the Red October steel works.  From that date until February 2, 1943, the division was involved in almost constant combat with numerically superior German forces. On October 14, 1942, the 39th repulsed a major German counterattack  involving three Infantry divisions, two Panzer divisions, and 3,000 combat sorties by the Luftwaffe.  For five months the 39th Guards maintained their tenuous hold on the Red October factory, holding an area only 3000 yards wide and 1000 yards in depth.  Along with similar pockets at the Dzerzhinsky tractor factory and the Barrikady gun factory, Red October represented one of the last viable defensive positions on the west bank of the Volga River.  Soviet troops fought major battles from building to building and room to room, with success often measured in mere yards. As the Germans desperately tried to eliminate these pockets they poured more and more troops into the city, weakening their flanks and wasting men and materiel in what was becoming a meat-grinder for the Wehrmacht.  These factors contributed directly the successes of the Soviet counter-offensives of November and December (see Operation Uranus and Operation Saturn), and the subsequent encirclement and eventual surrender of Gen. Friedrich Paulus's 6th Army.

Refit and Ukraine, 1943 

Following the victory at Stalingrad the remnants of the 62nd Army, including the 39th Guards, was placed in reserve and became the basis for the newly formed 8th Guards Army, receiving the honorific 'Guards' in honor of their heroic defense of Stalingrad. The army remained under the command of Lieutenant General Vasily Chuikov, its commander in Stalingrad. Through 1943 the 8th Guards Army fought across Ukraine, crossing the North Donets River, establishing a bridgehead south of Isyum, and in cooperation with adjacent armies, advanced on the Don Basin and ultimately liberated it. They fought across the Don, through Dnepropetrovsk, continuing to Zaporozhe, and participated in the fighting on the Zaporozhe bridgehead across the Dnepr on October 10–14.

1944 

The division turned south and fought for the liberation of Nikolayev in March 1944, and liberated Odessa in April.  Turning north into Moldavia the division liberated Kovel before participating in the Lvov-Sandomir Operation, which began on July 13 and lasted until August 29. On July 20, they crossed the Bug River and crossed  into Poland. On July 24, the 39th Guards liberated Lublin and continued to advance on Warsaw, establishing a major bridgehead on the Vistula River which was the key for the Soviet advance towards Silesia, central Poland and the German border. They encountered furious counterattacks by German units, with the 8th Army losing 17,000 men in the process.

1945 and the Battle of Berlin 

On January 12, the 39th Guards participated in the Vistula-Oder Offensive, which lasted 23 days and saw the division advance 500 km through Poland. They crushed the German defenders (including the elite "Großdeutschland Division") as they liberated the towns of Lodz and Posnan, finally arriving at the Oder River just north of Frankfurt on February 3.  They stormed the Kustrin Fortress and established a bridgehead over the Oder, within 60 km of Berlin. They attacked the city from the east, pushing through the area of Karlshorst, across Tempelhof Airport and Landwehr Canal, destroying the 11th SS Volunteer Panzergrenadier Division Nordland and then the 17th Panzer Division just south of the Reichstag.

The 39th Guards Rifle Division pushed north and fought through the Tiergarten, ending their war along Charlottenburger Chaussee at the Brandenburg Gate, meeting units from the 207th and 150th Rifle Divisions just 250 yards from the Reichstag. The final banner of the division, which had served from the center of Stalingrad to the center of Berlin, read: "39th Barvenkovskikh Guards Order of Lenin, Twice Order of the Red Banner, Order of Suvorov Second Class and Order of Bogdan Khmelnitsky Second Class Rifle Division."

Cold War Service 

Along with the rest of the 8th Guards Army, from 1949 the division was stationed in Ohrdruf, Gotha and Meiningen, East Germany (the GDR). Following the Second World War, the 39th Guards became a Motor Rifle Division in 1957. At different times (up to the 1980s), some regiments and separate battalions changed their garrison and placed in other cities of Thuringia - Arnstadt and Saalfeld. It was opposite the strategically vital Fulda Gap, and the U.S. V and VII US Corps in NATO's Central Army Group. The distance from the locations of parts of the division to the state border with Germany was about 5 kilometers.  Withdrawal from Germany began about October 28, 1991.

The division had the Military Unit Number 38865.

By a Resolution of the CPSU Central Committee, the Presidium of the Supreme Soviet of the USSR and the USSR Council of Ministers on 30 October 1967, the "For Service to protect the Soviet homeland and achieved high results in combat and political training and 50th Anniversary of the Great October Socialist Revolution to award the 39th Guards Motorized Rifle Barvenkovsky Order of Lenin Red Banner Orders of Suvorov twice and Bogdan Khmelnitsky Division the Commemorative Banner of the CPSU Central Committee, and leave it for an eternal possession as a symbol of valor.

Following the collapse of the Soviet Union and the reunification of Germany, the division was disbanded after a temporary relocation to Bila Tserkva in Ukraine in 1992.

See also
 List of infantry divisions of the Soviet Union 1917–1957

References

Further reading 
 Ионов В. М. «Неприступный бастион». Волгоград, 1977 г.;
 Морозов А. А. «39-я Барвенковская». Москва, 1981 г.;
 Исаев, Алексей Валерьевич "Сражения в логове зверя". Москва, Яуза, Эксмо, 2007 г.;
 Шеваров, Дмитрий Геннадьевич "Виноград. Фронтовая элегия в монологах и письмах", Журнал «Дружба Народов», 2010 г., No.5.
 Adrian Ermel  "Nachbarschaft zwischen Übung und Ernstfall" Оhrdruf und Truppenübungsplatz 1906 - 2009./"Соседство между учениями и чрезвычайным положением." Ордруф и полигон 1906 - 2009. Германия, Издательство "Rockstuhl", 2010 г.
 Бурлаков М.П. и др. "Советские войска в Германии 1945-1994". "Молодая гвардия", 1994 г.
 Ленский А.Г., Цыбин М.М. "Советские сухопутные войска в последний год Союза ССР. Справочник". С.-Пб., 2001 г.

External links 

 Home page of the re-enacted 117th Guards Rifle Regiment, 39th Guards Rifle Division, a World War II reenactment unit based in Ohio.

G039
Military units and formations established in 1957
Military units and formations awarded the Order of the Red Banner